Vongole Fisarmonica is the debut album by American accordion band Those Darn Accordions, released in 1992 by Globe Records. The album was originally released only on cassette tape before later being made available for digital download on iTunes and similar digital media stores.

Overview
Showcasing a seventeen-member line-up, Vongole Fisarmonica documents TDA at the peak of their early formation as a mostly instrumental mass accordion ensemble, before bandleader Paul Rogers would start restructuring the group into a tighter ten-member rock band for their subsequent album, Squeeze This!. In contrast to the rest of TDA's discography, Vongole Fisarmonica primarily consists of cover songs, tackling TDA's typical fare of classic polkas and offbeat covers of hard rock and pop songs. The album contains two original songs in "Lithuania" and "Chicken Boy Polka", as well as a parody of Arthur Godfreys "Too Fat Polka", re-written as "Too Smart Polka".

The title of the album is Italian for "Accordion Clams". According to member Tom Torriglia, musicians would often call mistakes "clams".

Track listing

Personnel
Those Darn Accordions

Tom Torriglia - accordion, lead vocals on track 5
Linda "Big Lou" Seekins - accordion
Suzanne Garramone - accordion
Clyde Forsman - accordion, lead vocals on track 4
Ron "Riff" Borelli - accordion
Ron "The Other Ron" Muriera - accordion
Chris Howard - accordion
Art Peterson - accordion
Piper Heisig - accordion

Paul Rogers - accordion, lead vocals on tracks 6 and 10
J. Raoul Bordy - accordion
Caroline Dahl - accordion
Patty Brady - accordion
Bill Schwartz - drums
Maurice Cridlin - bass guitar
Michael Lindner - accordion
Tony Johnson - accordion

References

1992 debut albums
Those Darn Accordions albums